The 2008 Trinidad and Tobago League Cup was the ninth season of the First Citizens Cup, which is the league cup competition for Trinidad and Tobago teams competing in the TT Pro League. The slogan for the year's league cup was No Room for Losers and was sponsored by First Citizens Bank for the eighth consecutive year. W Connection entered as the defending champions after having defeated Caledonia AIA 2–0 in the 2007 final for their fourth consecutive league cup title.

Qualification 

Seeding for the competition was determined from the league standings following the eighteenth league match day. The bottom four teams were placed in the qualifying round to determine which teams advance to the quarterfinals. The teams ranked from first to sixth advanced directly to the quarterfinals.

The automatic quarterfinal qualifiers in order of league position were: San Juan Jabloteh, W Connection, Caledonia AIA, United Petrotrin, Joe Public, and St. Ann's Rangers.

Schedule 
The schedule for the 2008 First Citizens Cup, as announced by the TT Pro League:

Bracket

Results 
All matches were played for 90 minutes duration, at the end of which if the match was still tied, penalty-kicks were used to determine the match winner.

Qualifying round 
The knockout cup began in the qualifying round with Tobago United and Defence Force recording upsets over higher-seeded Ma Pau and North East Stars respectively.

Quarterfinals 
Fans saw a goal spree in the quarterfinals where 22 goals were scored in four matches on 12 September, which saw Jabloteh, Joe Public, Rangers, and W Connection advance to the semifinals.

Semifinals 
On 19 September 2008, Joe Public used a lone goal from Gregory Richardson to advance to the final. In the other semifinal, W Connection blanked St. Ann's Rangers after goals from Jonathan Faña and Atiba McKnight on either side of half-time.

Third place 
With wins by Joe Public and W Connection in the semifinals; San Juan Jabloteh and St. Ann's Rangers were sent to the third place match. Before the final match, St. Ann's Rangers used strikes from Keyon Edwards and Josimar Belgrave in two minutes to put away top seeded San Juan Jabloteh for a third-place finish.

Final 
W Connection claimed their fifth consecutive title and sixth overall in the tournament's nine-year history with a win over Joe Public in the final. The match was held on 26 September in Manny Ramjohn Stadium. After being dead-locked 2–2 at the end of regulation, W Connection used a miss by Joe Public's Jason Springer on the twelfth kick from the penalty spot to win 6–5 in the shootout. Although Joe Public finished runners-up, Gregory Richardson led the tournament with four goals scored.

References

External links 
 Official Website

2008 First Citizens Cup
Trinidad and Tobago League Cup
Lea